Brijmanganj is a town in Uttar Pradesh, India, situated at the point of western Maharajganj district and the border of Siddharthnagar district. Bridgmanganj was accorded the status of Town Area Nagar Panchayat in 2020.

Bridgmanganj is connected to the rail link to the Gorakhpur, Gonda, Lucknow, etc. stations.
The town has now recognized as Nagar Panchayat by the state government. The order was passed by the former Chief Minister Akhilesh Yadav on the recommendation of Syed Arshad who is a very senior leader and former State Minister 

Villages in Siddharthnagar district